Jalaid Banner, officially Jalaid Qi (Mongolian:   Jalaid qosiɣu) Zhalaite Banner, Hinggan League is a banner under the jurisdiction of Hinggan League in the northeast of the Inner Mongolia Autonomous Region, People's Republic of China. Jalaid Mongols live here.

Administration
Jalaid has jurisdiction over 7 towns and 8 villages. The administrative center is Inder (音德尔镇).

Geography
Jalaid is surrounded by the Shenshan Mountains.

Climate

Economy
Major economic sectors include timber production, sheep farming, cereal crops and livestock export.

Town twinning
It has had a formal friendship link with Portsmouth, England since May 2004.

References

External links
  Official website 
  Official website

Banners of Inner Mongolia